The 2018 New Hampshire Executive Council elections were held on November 6, 2018 to elect all five members of the Executive Council of New Hampshire. The party primaries were held on September 11.

The Democrats gained a majority on the council for the first time since 2014.

Overview of results

District 1 
District 1 covered all of Coos, Carroll, and Grafton counties, plus the municipalities of Alton, Center Harbor, Gilford, Laconia, Meredith, New Hampton, Sanbornton, Tilton in Belknap County, the towns of Andover, Danbury, Hill, New London, and Wilmot in Merrimack County, the towns of Middleton, Milton, and New Durham in Strafford County, and the municipalities of Claremont, Cornish, Croydon, Grantham, Newport, Plainfield, Springfield, and Sunapee in Sullivan County.

General election 
Incumbent Republican councillor Joseph Kenney was defeated by Democratic challenger Michael Cyrans, a former banker and high school teacher.

District 2 
District 2 covered the towns of Barnstead, Belmont, and Gilmanton in Belknap County, the municipalities of Alstead, Chesterfield, Dublin, Gilsum, Harrisville, Hinsdale, Keene, Marlborough, Marlow, Nelson, Roxbury, Stoddard, Sullivan, Surry, Walpole, Westmoreland, and Winchester in Cheshire County, the town of Hancock in Hillsborough County, the municipalities of Boscawen, Bradford, Canterbury, Concord, Franklin, Henniker, Hopkinton, Newbury, Northfield, Salisbury, Sutton, Warner, and Webster in Merrimack County, the municipalities of Dover, Durham, Farmington, Madbury, Rochester, Rollinsford, Somersworth, and Strafford in Strafford County, and the towns of Acworth, Charlestown, Goshen, Langdon, Lempster, Unity, and Washington in Sullivan County.

General election 
Incumbent Democratic councillor Andru Volinsky won re-election over Republican challenger James Beard.

District 3 
District 3 covered the municipalities of Atkinson, Brentwood, Chester, Danville, Derry, East Kingston, Epping, Exeter, Fremont, Greenland, Hampstead, Hampton, Hampton Falls, Kensington, Kingston, New Castle, Newfields, Newington, Newmarket, Newton, North Hampton, Plaistow, Portsmouth, Raymond, Rye, Salem, Sandown, Seabrook, South Hampton, Stratham, and Windham in Rockingham County, and the town of Pelham in Hillsborough County.

General election

District 4 
District 4 covered the municipalities of Bedford, Goffstown, and Manchester Hillsborough County, the towns of Allenstown, Bow, Chichester, Epsom, Hooksett, Loudon, Pembroke, and Pittsfield in Merrimack County, the towns of Auburn, Candia, Deerfield, Londonderry, Northwood, and Nottingham in Rockingham County, and the towns of Barrington and Lee in Strafford County.

General election

District 5 
District 5 covered the towns of Fitzwilliam, Jaffrey, Richmond, Rindge, Swanzey, and Troy in Cheshire County, the town of Dunbarton in Merrimack County, and the municipalities of Amherst, Antrim, Bennington, Brookline, Deering, Francestown, Greenfield, Greenville, Hillsborough, Hollis, Hudson, Litchfield, Lyndeborough, Mason, Merrimack, Milford, Mont Vernon, Nashua, New Boston, New Ipswich, Peterborough, Sharon, Temple, Weare, Wilton, and Windsor in Hillsborough County.

General election

References 

Executive Council
2018
New Hampshire Executive Council